Liverpool Marina is a Marina in Coburg Dock, Liverpool, Merseyside. It has 340 berths. It includes a venue called the Yacht Club and Restaurant. It is the home of Liverpool Yacht Club who have no affiliation with the marina.

References

External links
https://www.liverpoolmarina.com/

Marinas in England
Mersey docks
Transport in Liverpool
River Mersey